Laurien Gardner is the collective pseudonym of a group of female authors writing a series of Tudor era novels about the wives of Henry VIII. These historical romance novels are published by Jove Books, part of Penguin Books.

The series was conceived by editor Ginjer Buchanan and capitalized on the popularity of books and series about the Tudors.

Published works
The Spanish Bride: A Novel of Catherine of Aragon, 2005, written by Julianne Ardian Lee
A Lady Raised High: A Novel of Anne Boleyn, 2006, written by Allyson James (also known as Jennifer Ashley and Ashley Gardner)
Plain Jane: A Novel of Jane Seymour, 2006, written by Sarah A. Hoyt

References

House names
Historical novelists
Women novelists
Writers of historical fiction set in the early modern period
RITA Award winners
21st-century pseudonymous writers
Collective pseudonyms
Pseudonymous women writers